The Bankruptcy Act 1705 (4 & 5 Ann. c. 4) was an Act of Parliament of England.

Content
Under the Act, the Lord Chancellor was given power to discharge bankrupts, once disclosure of all assets and various procedures had been fulfilled.

Discharge from debt was introduced for those who cooperated with creditors. The discharge took effect once a bankrupt obtained a certificate of the bankruptcy commissioners providing that there has been full disclosure and adherence to their directions.

See also
UK insolvency law
UK bankruptcy law
History of bankruptcy law

Notes

Insolvency law of the United Kingdom
English laws
Acts of the Parliament of England
1705 in law
1705 in England